Danger Girl is a third-person shooter video game developed by n-Space and published by THQ. It was released for the PlayStation, and is loosely based on the comic book of the same name. It follows Abbey Chase, Sydney Savage and JC as they battle Major Maxim and Natalia Kassle.

Gameplay
Each girl has a specific equipment, mostly limited to differences between the weapons. In overall 12 levels, the goal is to make a way through the terrain that contains a certain numbers of enemies that will block the way. They will actively run and notice when the players step out from hiding. There is no way to save progress during the missions. In case the character dies during a mission, it will restart from the beginning. All levels have interactive puzzle elements with occasional cutscenes.

Development
In 1998, n-Space had acquired exclusive rights to develop a video game based on the Danger Girl comic book. There was no publisher attached at that time as the developing team was working on Duke Nukem: Time to Kill.

Reception

The game received "generally unfavorable reviews" according to the review aggregation website Metacritic.

References

External links

2000 video games
PlayStation (console) games
PlayStation (console)-only games
Third-person shooters
THQ games
Video games based on comics
Video games featuring female protagonists
Video games developed in the United States